Raja Sikandar Zaman Khan (Urdu/Pashto: راجہ سکندر زمان ; born 1935 died 16 March 2007) was a Pakistani politician and the former Chief Minister of Khyber-Pakhtunkhwa. During a 50-year political career he served as Minister, Senior Minister, Federal Minister of Pakistan, and opposition leader in the NWFP Assembly for a long time. His first political office was in the 1960s as a member of the Abbottabad District Council.

Early life and education
He was born in Khanpur. His father Sultan Capt. Raja Haider Zaman Khan was active in politics.  He received his early education from Burn Hall School in Abbottabad and Aligarh University.

Career
He started his political career as Member of the Abbottabad District Council in the 1950s, while his brother Raja Rukan Zaman (late) was Member Legislative Assembly, West Pakistan. He remained Chief Minister, Khyber-Pakhtunkhwa, Minister for WAPDA, Education and Revenue respectively. He was also the opposition leader Khyber-Pakhtunkhwa Assembly and a Senior Minister in the Provincial Cabinet.
 
Brief History of Political Career, MPA- 1957 Lahore Assembly Chairman Union Council Khanpur- 1960 Senior Vice Chairman Hazara Division - 1965 Provincial Minister for Education, Sports and Tourism - 1973 Provincial Minister for Agriculture- 1977 Federal Minister for Water, Power and Natural Resources - 1981-1985 MNA and Opposition Leader - 1988 Senior Minister Excise and Revenue - 1990-1993

References 

1935 births
2007 deaths
People from Haripur District
Chief Ministers of Khyber Pakhtunkhwa
Hindkowan people